Ignacio Nicolás Huguenet (born 5 March 1998) is an Argentine professional footballer who plays as a centre-forward for Newell's Old Boys.

Career
Huguenet's career began with Academia Griffa before joining Newell's Old Boys, firstly in the youth system from 2012 and then in the first-team from 2017. He was an unused substitute for a 2016–17 Primera División match with Olimpo in May 2017, prior to making his professional debut during 2017–18 when he was substituted on for the final six minutes in a 1–0 loss to Lanús on 25 September 2017. Huguenet was loaned to fellow Primera División side Defensa y Justicia in July 2018. He'd appear eight times for the Florencio Varela outfit, as they placed second; missing the title by four points.

In January 2020, Huguenet completed a loan move to Peruvian football with Primera División side Sport Boys. He made his debut in a 3–2 victory over Deportivo Llacuabamba on 2 February, having replaced Piero Ratto after sixty-six minutes. His first goal arrived during his first home start, as he netted a brace in a 3–3 draw against Universitario on 1 March. Another goal followed in November versus Universidad César Vallejo, as he made a total of twenty-three appearances. He announced his departure from Sport Boys at the conclusion of the 2020 campaign.

Career statistics
.

References

External links

1998 births
Living people
Footballers from Rosario, Santa Fe
Argentine footballers
Association football forwards
Argentine expatriate footballers
Expatriate footballers in Peru
Argentine expatriate sportspeople in Peru
Argentine Primera División players
Peruvian Primera División players
Newell's Old Boys footballers
Defensa y Justicia footballers
Sport Boys footballers
Instituto footballers